Kórinn is an indoor multipurpose auditorium located in Kópavogur and built in 2007. It includes an indoor football stadium which meets all the international standards set by the International Football Association FIFA.

The auditorium covers an area of 14,457 m2 and has a seating capacity of 2000 spectators plus an additional 50 honor places.

The auditorium is designed to accommodate concert acoustics and has a total standing capacity of up to 19,000 visitors.

Canadian recording artist, singer-songwriter Justin Bieber performed 2 sold-out shows at the arena on September 8 and 9, 2016 as a part of his Purpose World Tour.

References 
 Kórinn heitir nýtt hús í Kópavogi tekur 2.000 áhorfendur á fótboltaleiki og 19.000 tónleikagesti
 Kórinn

Football venues in Iceland
Music venues in Iceland
Sport in Kópavogur
Buildings and structures in Capital Region (Iceland)
2007 establishments in Iceland
Sports venues completed in 2007
Event venues established in 2007